Scrimshaw is a surname. Notable people with the surname include:

Charlie Scrimshaw (1909–1973), English footballer
Joseph Scrimshaw, American comedian
Nevin S. Scrimshaw (1918–2013), American food scientist
George Scrimshaw English Cricketer
Sandelle D. Scrimshaw, Canadian diplomat
Stan Scrimshaw (1915–1988), English footballer

Fictional characters 

A character in the film Innerspace